Leslie Albert Knight was the third Anglican Bishop of Bunbury from 1938  to 1950

Knight as born on 4 August 1890 and educated at Christchurch Boys' High School and the University of New Zealand; and ordained in 1915 His first post was a curacy at Fendalton and then as a chaplain to the NZEF in France.  At the end of World War I he was vicar of Leithfield then Kaiapoi. Next he was rector and chaplain of St Saviour's Boys’ Orphanage, Timaru. His last appointment before ordination to the episcopate was as warden of St Barnabas' Theological College, Adelaide.  He died on 31 December 1950. His wife was President of the Mothers’ Union Commonwealth Council.

References

External links

People from Bunbury, Western Australia
People educated at Christchurch Boys' High School
Religious leaders from Christchurch
University of New Zealand alumni
Anglican bishops of Bunbury
20th-century Anglican bishops in Australia
1890 births
1950 deaths
New Zealand military chaplains
World War I chaplains